Anne Chirnside (born 9 September 1954) is an Australian rower. She competed in the women's coxed four event at the 1980 Summer Olympics.

References

External links
 

1954 births
Living people
Australian female rowers
Olympic rowers of Australia
Rowers at the 1980 Summer Olympics
Place of birth missing (living people)